Roni is a Local Government Area of Jigawa State, Nigeria. Its headquarters are in the town of Roni.

It has an area of 322 km and a population of 77,819 at the 2006 census.

The postal code of the area is 705.

References

Local Government Areas in Jigawa State